Serge Marcil  (January 20, 1944 – January 12, 2010) was an educator, administrator and politician in Quebec, Canada.

After studying to be a teacher in Montreal, Marcil obtained work at various secondary schools as an administrator. He also served on his local city council in the early 1980s before entering the Quebec National Assembly as a Liberal Member of the National Assembly (MNA)  in the 1985 Quebec provincial election in the riding of Beauharnois. He was re-elected in 1989, and became parliamentary assistant to the Minister of Labour in the Bourassa government. In 1994, he joined the provincial cabinet of Daniel Johnson as Minister of Employment, but both he and the Liberal government were defeated in the 1994 provincial election.

Marcil entered federal politics by defeating Bloc Québécois (BQ) Member of Parliament (MP) Daniel Turp in the riding of Beauharnois—Salaberry in the 2000 federal election. The Liberal MP became parliamentary secretary to the Minister of Industry in 2002. When Paul Martin succeeded Jean Chrétien as Prime Minister of Canada in 2003, he appointed Marcil to the position of parliamentary secretary to the Minister of the Environment with special emphasis on parks. He was also appointed to the Queen's Privy Council for Canada when Martin decided that parliamentary secretaries should be members of that body.

Marcil ran for re-election in the 2004 general election but was defeated by Alain Boire of the BQ.

Marcil was killed in the earthquake in Haiti on January 12, 2010 (8 days shy of his 66th birthday). He had just arrived in Port-au-Prince on a business trip for his current employer, the Montreal engineering firm Groupe SM International. On January 23, his wife confirmed that Marcil's body had been found in the rubble of the Hôtel Montana. He had died instantly, on the fifth floor of the hotel.

Marcil's funeral was held on January 29 at Salaberry-de-Valleyfield, Quebec.

Electoral record (partial)

References

External links
 
 

1944 births
2010 deaths
Quebec Liberal Party MNAs
Members of the House of Commons of Canada from Quebec
Members of the King's Privy Council for Canada
Liberal Party of Canada MPs
Université de Montréal alumni
People from Salaberry-de-Valleyfield
Victims of the 2010 Haiti earthquake
21st-century Canadian politicians